South Plainfield is a borough in Middlesex County, in the U.S. state of New Jersey. It is located in the heart of the Raritan Valley region. As of the 2020 United States census, the borough's population was 24,338, an increase of 953 (+4.1%) from the 2010 census count of 23,385, which in turn reflected an increase of 1,575 (+7.2%) from the 21,810 counted in the 2000 census.

South Plainfield was incorporated by an act of the New Jersey Legislature on March 12, 1926, from portions of Piscataway Township, based on the results of a referendum passed on April 6, 1926. The borough's name derives from Plainfield, which derived its name from a local estate or from its scenic location.

Geography
According to the United States Census Bureau, the borough had a total area of 8.33 square miles (21.58 km2), including 8.30 square miles (21.49 km2) of land and 0.04 square miles (0.09 km2) of water (0.42%).

Unincorporated communities, localities and place names located partially or completely within the township include Avon Park, Hadley Airport, Holly Park and Samptown.

The borough is bordered by Piscataway Township on the south and west, Edison Township on the east, both in Middlesex County, and Plainfield on the north and Scotch Plains both in Union County.

Demographics

2010 census

The Census Bureau's 2006–2010 American Community Survey showed that (in 2010 inflation-adjusted dollars) median household income was $92,263 (with a margin of error of +/− $5,066) and the median family income was $98,913 (+/− $4,289). Males had a median income of $61,480 (+/− $7,597) versus $48,639 (+/− $4,924) for females. The per capita income for the borough was $33,495 (+/− $1,546). About 2.7% of families and 4.0% of the population were below the poverty line, including 3.9% of those under age 18 and 2.5% of those age 65 or over.

2000 census
As of the 2000 United States census there were 21,810 people, 7,151 households, and 5,856 families residing in the borough. The population density was 2,609.8 people per square mile (1,007.3/km2). There were 7,307 housing units at an average density of 874.3 per square mile (337.5/km2). The racial makeup of the borough was 77.74% White, 8.56% African American, 0.22% Native American, 7.57% Asian, 3.48% from other races, and 2.42% from two or more races. Hispanic or Latino of any race were 8.66% of the population.

There were 7,151 households, out of which 37.6% had children under the age of 18 living with them, 66.8% were married couples living together, 10.9% had a female householder with no husband present, and 18.1% were non-families. 15.3% of all households were made up of individuals, and 7.5% had someone living alone who was 65 years of age or older. The average household size was 3.01 and the average family size was 3.35.

In the borough, the population was spread out, with 25.1% under the age of 18, 7.2% from 18 to 24, 29.9% from 25 to 44, 23.7% from 45 to 64, and 14.1% who were 65 years of age or older. The median age was 38 years. For every 100 females, there were 96.1 males. For every 100 females age 18 and over, there were 92.6 males.

The median income for a household in the borough was $67,466, and the median income for a family was $72,745. Males had a median income of $47,465 versus $34,329 for females. The per capita income for the borough was $25,270. About 2.3% of families and 3.4% of the population were below the poverty line, including 3.7% of those under age 18 and 4.4% of those age 65 or over.

Economy
Tumi Inc. is a manufacturer of suitcases and bags for travel that was founded in 1975 by Charlie Clifford after serving in Peru with the Peace Corps.

PTC Therapeutics is a pharmaceutical company focused on the development of small molecule, orally administered treatments for orphan diseases.

Jem Records (also known as JEM Records) was a record label that existed from 1970 to 1988, at the time principally known as the parent company of Passport Records; The label was resurrected in 2013 as Jem Recordings.

Sports
The Plainfield Curling Club is a curling club that owns and operates the only dedicated curling facility in New Jersey. Established in 1963, the club's two-sheet structure was completed in 1967.

Government

Local government
South Plainfield is governed under the Borough form of New Jersey municipal government, which is used in 218 municipalities (of the 564) statewide, making it the most common form of government in New Jersey. The governing body is comprised of the Mayor and the Borough Council, with all positions elected at-large on a partisan basis as part of the November general election. The Mayor is elected directly by the voters to a four-year term of office. The Borough Council is comprised of six members elected to serve three-year terms on a staggered basis, with two seats coming up for election each year in a three-year cycle. The Borough form of government used by South Plainfield is a "weak mayor / strong council" government in which council members act as the legislative body with the mayor presiding at meetings and voting only in the event of a tie. The mayor can veto ordinances subject to an override by a two-thirds majority vote of the council. The mayor makes committee and liaison assignments for council members, and most appointments are made by the mayor with the advice and consent of the council.

, the Mayor of South Plainfield is Republican Matthew P. Anesh, whose term of office ends December 31, 2026. Members of the South Plainfield Borough Council are Council President Robert A. Bengivenga Jr. (R, 2024) Christine Noonan Faustini (R, 2023), Melanie McCann-Mott (R, 2022), Peter D. Smith (R, 2022), Derryck C. White (R, 2023) and Joseph Wolak (R, 2024).

Federal, state and county representation

 

Middlesex County is governed by a Board of County Commissioners, whose seven members are elected at-large on a partisan basis to serve three-year terms of office on a staggered basis, with either two or three seats coming up for election each year as part of the November general election. At an annual reorganization meeting held in January, the board selects from among its members a commissioner director and deputy director. , Middlesex County's Commissioners (with party affiliation, term-end year, and residence listed in parentheses) are 
Commissioner Director Ronald G. Rios (D, Carteret, term as commissioner ends December 31, 2024; term as commissioner director ends 2022),
Commissioner Deputy Director Shanti Narra (D, North Brunswick, term as commissioner ends 2024; term as deputy director ends 2022),
Claribel A. "Clary" Azcona-Barber (D, New Brunswick, 2022),
Charles Kenny (D, Woodbridge Township, 2022),
Leslie Koppel (D, Monroe Township, 2023),
Chanelle Scott McCullum (D, Piscataway, 2024) and 
Charles E. Tomaro (D, Edison, 2023).
Constitutional officers are
County Clerk Nancy Pinkin (D, 2025, East Brunswick),
Sheriff Mildred S. Scott (D, 2022, Piscataway) and 
Surrogate Claribel Cortes (D, 2026; North Brunswick).

Politics
As of March 2011, there were a total of 14,119 registered voters in South Plainfield, of which 4,368 (30.9%) were registered as Democrats, 2,235 (15.8%) were registered as Republicans and 7,511 (53.2%) were registered as Unaffiliated. There were 5 voters registered as Libertarians or Greens.

In the 2012 presidential election, Democrat Barack Obama received 57.9% of the vote (5,720 cast), ahead of Republican Mitt Romney with 40.9% (4,043 votes), and other candidates with 1.2% (114 votes), among the 9,974 ballots cast by the borough's 14,424 registered voters (97 ballots were spoiled), for a turnout of 69.1%. In the 2008 presidential election, Democrat Barack Obama received 53.4% of the vote (5,723 cast), ahead of Republican John McCain with 44.7% (4,797 votes) and other candidates with 1.0% (110 votes), among the 10,720 ballots cast by the borough's 14,454 registered voters, for a turnout of 74.2%. In the 2004 presidential election, Democrat John Kerry received 49.9% of the vote (4,893 ballots cast), outpolling Republican George W. Bush with 49.0% (4,808 votes) and other candidates with 0.5% (67 votes), among the 9,803 ballots cast by the borough's 13,191 registered voters, for a turnout percentage of 74.3.

In the 2013 gubernatorial election, Republican Chris Christie received 63.7% of the vote (3,950 cast), ahead of Democrat Barbara Buono with 35.2% (2,186 votes), and other candidates with 1.1% (68 votes), among the 6,289 ballots cast by the borough's 14,512 registered voters (85 ballots were spoiled), for a turnout of 43.3%. In the 2009 gubernatorial election, Republican Chris Christie received 51.6% of the vote (3,616 ballots cast), ahead of Democrat Jon Corzine with 39.0% (2,736 votes), Independent Chris Daggett with 7.6% (534 votes) and other candidates with 0.8% (55 votes), among the 7,010 ballots cast by the borough's 14,053 registered voters, yielding a 49.9% turnout.

Education
The South Plainfield Public Schools serve students in pre-kindergarten through twelfth grade. As of the 2020–21 school year, the district, comprised of seven schools, had an enrollment of 3,400 students and 304.0 classroom teachers (on an FTE basis), for a student–teacher ratio of 11.2:1. The schools in the district (with 2020–21 enrollment data from the National Center for Education Statistics). are 
Franklin Elementary School with 264 students in grades K-4, 
John F. Kennedy Elementary School with 268 students in grades PreK-4, 
John E. Riley Elementary School with 333 students in grades PreK-4, 
Roosevelt Elementary School with 448 students in grades PreK-4, 
Grant School with 444 students in grades 5-6, 
South Plainfield Middle School with 529 students in grades 7-8 and 
South Plainfield High School with 1,076 students in grades 9-12.

Holy Savior Academy is a Catholic school serving students in preschool through eighth grade that operates under the supervision of Roman Catholic Diocese of Metuchen.

Al-Minhaal Academy is a private Islamic school serving students in kindergarten through twelfth grade.

Lincoln Technical Institute's campus in South Plainfield (formerly known as Engine City Technical Institute) is an accredited, diesel technology school that was established in 1969 as a training center to accommodate the need for diesel mechanics.

Transportation

Roads and highways

Interstate 287 passes through in the southern area of the borough for almost , including exits 4 and 5. The New Jersey Turnpike is accessible in neighboring Edison Township (via I-287).

The major county roads that pass through include CR 501 (New Durham Road) along the southern border with Piscataway Township, CR 529 (Stelton Road) along the southwestern border with Piscataway and CR 531 (Park Avenue) along the east side of the borough, from Edison Township to the south to Plainfield to the north.

Public transportation
NJ Transit provided bus service between the borough and the Port Authority Bus Terminal in Midtown Manhattan on the 114 route, to Newark on the 65 route and local service on the 819 line.

Notable people

People who were born in, residents of, or otherwise closely associated with South Plainfield include:
 Anthony Ashnault (born 1995), freestyle wrestler
 John Bundy, magician and magic consultant
 Patrick J. Diegnan (born 1949), represents the 18th Legislative District in the New Jersey General Assembly
 Greg Garbowsky (born 1986), bassist for Jonas Brothers
 Joshua Gomez (born 1975), appeared in the NBC series Chuck
 Rick Gomez (born 1972), actor best known for portraying Sgt. George Luz, in the HBO television miniseries Band of Brothers
 Ricky Gonzalez (born 1966), stock car racing driver
 Dontae Johnson (born 1991), cornerback for the San Francisco 49ers of the NFL
 Dennis Madalone (born 1960), stunt coordinator and musician, best known for his patriotic song "America We Stand As One"
 Josh Pauls (born 1992), ice sledge hockey player who was the youngest member of the U.S. National Sled Hockey Team that won the gold medal at the 2010 Winter Paralympics in Vancouver and won gold again at the 2014 Winter Paralympics in Sochi
 Michael Price (born 1958), WGA Award and Emmy Award winning writer and producer best known for his work on The Simpsons and as co-creator of the Netflix series F is for Family
 Michelle Visage (born 1968), radio DJ, singer, actress, producer, media personality, and television host who has appeared as a judge on RuPaul's Drag Race

References

External links

 South Plainfield Home Page
 South Plainfield Public Schools
 
 School Data for the South Plainfield Public Schools, National Center for Education Statistics
 South Plainfield Public Library

 
1926 establishments in New Jersey
Borough form of New Jersey government
Boroughs in Middlesex County, New Jersey
Populated places established in 1926